The UTSA Roadrunners college football team represents the University of Texas at San Antonio in the West Division of Conference USA (C-USA), competing as a part of the National Collegiate Athletic Association (NCAA) Division I Football Bowl Subdivision. The program has had two head coaches since its first season during the 2011 season; it began play as an FCS independent, but transitioned to the WAC the next season, then to Conference USA beginning with the 2013 season. Jeff Traylor is the football coach of the Roadrunners currently; he was hired on December 9, 2019.

The nickname "Roadrunners" has been used by UTSA's athletic programs since 1978, after winning out over "Armadillos" in an election among the university's student body the prior year. The Roadrunners have played in 82 games over seven seasons. Frank Wilson led the program to its only bowl appearance in 2016, the New Mexico Bowl. Neither coach has led the program to a division, conference, or national championship, nor have they been enshrined into the College Football Hall of Fame. Larry Coker leads among the two in games coached (58), wins (26), and losses (32). Traylor leads in total win percentage, as well in conference play.

Key

Coaches

Notes

References
General

 
 

Specific

UTSA

UTSA Roadrunners Football, Head Coaches
UTSA Roadrunners head football coaches